Sean Murphy is an Australian journalist.

He was born in Western Australia in 1961.  He was brought up on Rottnest Island where his parents owned a pub.  He began working in journalism in 1979, when he worked for the Sunday Independent in Perth.  He subsequently moved to the Australian Broadcasting Corporation.  He is currently a producer for ABC Television's Landline program since 2002.

He is married, lives in Sydney and has two children.

References

 Men at Birth, David Vernon, Australian College of Midwives, Canberra, 2006, p183

Living people
Australian journalists
Writers from Perth, Western Australia
Year of birth missing (living people)